John W. Vogt (December 28, 1936 – March 21, 2018) was an American engineer and politician in the state of Florida.

Vogt was born in Lake Wales, Florida in 1936. He attended the University of Florida, University of South Florida, and Rutgers University and was an engineer. He was elected to the State Senate for the 17th district in 1972 and served until 1988. He was a former president of the Florida Senate. He died on March 21, 2018, at the age of 81 after a struggle with interstitial fibrosis.

His great great uncle Daniel A. Vogt was a member of the Florida House of Representatives during the Civil War.

References

1936 births
2018 deaths
People from Lake Wales, Florida
Democratic Party Florida state senators
University of Florida alumni
University of South Florida alumni
Rutgers University alumni
Engineers from Florida